Rian John Gordon is a Scottish actor best known for his role as Conor Brodie in River City and Young Jerome in Silent Witness.

Career

Gordon played the role as Conor Brodie on the BBC Scotland soap opera River City from 12 October 2010 to 2013.

Filmography

References

External links

Scottish male child actors
People from Kilmarnock
Living people
Scottish male television actors
1997 births